Kongjian Yu (simplified Chinese: 俞孔坚; traditional Chinese: 俞孔堅; pinyin: Yú kǒngjiān, born in 1963 in Dongyu Village in Jinhua, Zhejiang Province, China), is a landscape architect and urbanist, writer and educator, commonly credited with the invention of Sponge City concept, and winner of the International Federation of Landscape Architects’ Sir Geoffrey Jellicoe Award in 2020. Received his Doctor of Design Degree from Harvard Graduate Schoolof Design in 1995, Doctor Honoris Causa from Sapienza University of Rome in 2017 and Honorary Doctorate from Norwegian University of Life Sciences in 2019, Yu was elected to the American Academy of Arts and Sciences in 2016.

A farmer’s son and a strong advocate ecological urbanism, Yu is a founder of the Peking University College of Architecture and Landscape Architecture. He is also founder and principal designer of Turenscape, which Fast Company called one of The 10 Most Innovative Architecture Companies of 2021 for “balancing China’s hyperspeed urbanization with green ‘sponge cities’”. An often-outspoken voice in the world of landscape architecture and urbanism, Yu has been heralded by Michael Sorkin as “a hero of effective advocacy within a system fraught with perils”. Several of Yu’s core ideas for nature-based climate adaptations and ecological restoration, including the sponge city concept, have been adopted for nationwide implementation by the Chinese government and had a global reach.

Career
Kongjian Yu received his Doctor of Design Degree at The Harvard Graduate School of Design in 1995, with the dissertation, "Security Patterns in Landscape Planning: With a Case in South China" with Carl Steinitz, Richard Forman and Stephen Ervin as his advisors. He worked as landscape planner and architect at SWA Group in Laguna Beach from 1995-1997. He has been a professor of urban and regional planning at Peking University since 1997 and visiting professor at Harvard GSD from 2010-2015. He is the founder and Dean of the Graduate School of Landscape Architecture and the College of Architecture and Landscape Architecture. He has been the founder and Chief editor of the award-winning magazine Landscape Architecture Frontier that publishes bi-monthly. He founded Turenscape in 1998, an internationally awarded firm with about 500 professionals and was listed as one of the top 10 most innovative architecture companies of 2021 by the Fast Company. Yu and Turenscape's practice covers architecture, landscape architecture, and urbanism across scales. Yu defines landscape architecture as the art of survival. He is globally recognized as a leader in ecological  urbanism and constructive postmodernism approach towards ecological civilization. He is particularly recognized for his theory and practice of  "sponge cities". His innovative concept and research on "ecological security patterns".Negative Planning and sponge city  have been adopted by the Chinese government as a guiding theory for national land use planning, eco-city campaign, and urban ecological restoration.

A native of China's Zhejiang Province. He is a design ecologist and practices design as scientific experiments. Yu's ecological approach to urbanism has been implemented in over 200 cities in China and beyond. His Sponge City theory and practices have been globally recogzinzed as revolutionary nature-based solutions for climate adaptation with strategies of retaining water at its source, slowing down its flow and being adaptive at its sink that are based on a philosophy totally opposite to that of conventional grey infrastructure approach.

Published works 

Yu has published over 20 books and 300 articles.  His works have been featured in publications such as Scientific American (December 2018), Time, and Landscape Architecture (February 2012), and two recently published books: Letters to Chinese Leaders: Kongjian Yu and the Future of the Chinese City and Designed Ecologies: The landscape Architecture of Kongjian Yu.

Achievements
He is the founder and chief editor of the magazine Landscape Architecture Frontier. He lectured worldwide at over 100 institutes including American Academy of Arts and Sciences, National Academy of Sciences, World Economic Forum, World Bank, Harvard University, Columbia University, UC Berkeley, and many others,  and had delivered over 60 keynote speeches at international conferences including 5 time keynote speeches at the World Congress of the International Federation of Landscape Architects  and 3 time speeches at the ASLA annual conference and expo, and taught for 5 year at Harvard GSD as visiting professor. He was a juror for the 2010 Aga Khan Award for Architecture and its Steering Committee in 2015–2016, and the Super Jury for 2011 World Architecture Festival, and many other international award juries. He was elected fellow of the American Society of Landscape Architects in 2012, and International Honorary Member of the American Academy of Arts and Sciences in 2016.  He received Doctor Honoris Causa in Landscape and Environment from the Sapienza University of Rome in 2017, and Honorary Doctor in Landscape architecture from the Norwegian University of Life Sciences in 2019. In 2020 Yu received the 2020 Sir Geoffrey Jellicoe Awardfor his “achievements and contributions have had a unique and lasting impact on the welfare of society and the environment and on the promotion of the profession of landscape architecture.”  and received the 2021 John Cobb Common Good Award for his achievement on " Constructive Postmodernism Approach Towards Ecological Civilization".

Notable Works
Tongan Wetland Park (2021 AZ Awards of Best Landscape Architecture)
Kaban Lake Waterfront: Revitalizing Kazan's Prime Waterfront, Kazan, Russia (2018) (2019 APA International Planning Excellence Award, Grand Award for Urban Design / Kevin Lynch Award, American Planning Association)
Sanya Mangrove Park: Form Follows Processes, Sanya, China  (2016) (2019 AZ Awards of Best Landscape Architecture, 2020 ASLA Honor Award)
Puyangjiang River Corridor:Building a Greenway, Jinhua, China (2016)(2019 FuturArc Green Leadership Award)
Chengtoushan Archaeological Park: Peasants and their Land, The Recovered Landscape of an ancient city, Lixian, Hunan, China (2016) (WAF Landscape of The Year Award, 2017 World Architecture Festival)
Quzhou Luming Park: Framing Terrain and Water, Quzhou, China  (2015) (2016 ASLA Honor Award)
Yanweizhou Park in Jinhua City: A Flood Adaptive Landscape, Jinua, China (2014)(WAF Landscape of the year Award, 2015 World Architecture Festival)  Liupanshui Minghu Wetland Park: Slow Dow, Liupanshui, China (2012) (2014 ASLA Honor Award)
Qunli Stormwater Park: A Green Sponge for a Water-Resilient City, Harbin, China  (2011) (2012 ASLA Award of Excellence)
Qian'an Sanlihe Greenway: A Mother River Recovered, Tangshan, China  (2010) (2013 ASLA Honor Award)
Shanghai Houtan Park: Landscape as a living system, Shanghai, China (2009) (2010 ASLA Award of Excellence)
Tianjin Qiaoyuan Park: The Adaptation Palettes, Tianjin, China (2008) (2010 ASLA Honor Award)
Qinhuangdao Beach Restoration: An Ecological Surgery, Qinhuangdao, China (2008). (2010 ASLA Honor Award)
The Red Ribbon ParK: Minimum Intervention To Create an Urban Greenway, Qinhuangdao, China(2006) (2007 ASLA Design Honor Award)
Yongning River Park: The Floating Gardens, Taizhou, China (2005) (2006 ASLA Design Honor Award)
The Growth Pattern of Taizhou City Based on Ecological Infrastructure, Taizhou, China (2004) (2005 ASLA Honor Award)
Shenyang Jianzhu University Campus, Shenyang, China (2003) (2005 ASLA Design Honor Award)
Zhongshan Shipyard Park: Value the ordinary, Zhongzhan, China (2001) (2002, ASLA Design Honor Award)

Awards
Yu's projects received both 2009，2010， 2011， 2015 and 2017 World Architecture Festival Awards of Landscape the 2009 Urban Land Institute Global Award for Excellence, the 2010 and 2012 ASLA award of Excellence, and 13 ASLA Honor Awards, 4 AZ Awards, the 2004 National Gold Medal of Fine Arts of China On September 20 , 2019, Norwegian University of Life Science (NMBU) granted an honorary doctorate to Professor Kongjian Yu, for his breakthrough in sustainable landscape design and contribution to harmony between nature and humanity.

Publications

Books 

Yu, Kongjian(2019), Ideal Landscapes and the Deep Meaning of Feng-Shui: Patterns of Biological and Cultural Genes, ORO EDITIONS, Novato CA, USA, 
Yu, Kongjian(2016), Sponge City: Theory and Practice. China Architecture & Building Press.  
Yu, Kongjian, Li Dihua, Li Hailong, Qiao Qin (2012), China National Ecological Security Patterns. China Architecture & Building Press.  
Yu, Kongjian, Li DIhua, Li Hailong and Zhanglei (2012), The Grand Canal National Heritage and Ecological Corrido, Peking University Press, 
Yu, Kongjian Wang Sisi, Li DIhua (2011), Regional Ecological Security patterns, The Beijing Case. China Architecture & Building Press. 
Yu, Kongjian  (2009), Back to Land, Commercial Press, Beijing, China. , 
Yu, Kongjian (2006), Art of Survival: Positioning Contemporary Landscape Architecture, China Architecture & Building Press. 

"Experiencing landscape is the root of landscape design. Udo Weilacher interviews Kongjian Yu in: nodium, Magazine of the Alumni-Club Landscape at the Technical University of Munich 2017  (PDF)

Articles 
 2021, Yu,K. Sponge City: Planning and Design and Political Design, In: Design Studio Sofie Pelsmakers and Nick Newman, Architecture and The Climate Emergency. Everything Needs to Change, RIBA, 47-55. 
 2020, Kongjian Yu Wins 2020 Sir Geoffrey Jellicoe Award; Read His Full Speech. DIRT, American Society of Landscape Architects, The Dirt Contributor, 10/08/202010/12/2020
 2020 Yu, K., Beautiful China and the Mission of Landscape Architecture, in Beautiful China: Reflections on Landscape Architecture in Contemporary China edited by Richard J. Weller & Tatum L. Hands, ORO Editions, 2020, pp22–29
 2017, Yu, Kongjian, Green Infrastructure through the Revival of Ancient Wisdom, American Academy of Arts and Sciences Bulletin, Summer 2017, Vol. LXX, No.4:35-39
 2016, Yu, Kongjian, Creating deep forms in urban nature: the peasant's approach to urban design, in Frederick R. Steiner, George F. Thompson and Armando Carbonell (Eds.), Nature and Cities—The Ecological Imperative in Urban Design and Planning, Lincoln Institute of Land Policy, pp95–117
 2016, Yu, Kongjian,  Think like a king, act like a peasant: the power of a landscape architect and some personal experience, in Christophe Girot and Dora Imhof (Eds.), Thinking the contemporary landscape, Princeton architectural press, 2016, pp164–184
 2014, Yu, Kongjian, Complete Water, in: Anuradha Mathur and Dilip Da Cunha (eds.) Design in the Terrain of Water. Applied Research + Design Publishing with the University of Pennsylvania, School of Design.pp. 57–65.
 2013, Yu, Kongjian, Integration Across Scales: Landscape as Infrastructure for the Protection of Biodiversity in: John Beardsley (Editor), Designing Wildlife Habitats, 241–71, Dumbarton Oaks, Trustees for Harvard University, Washington, D.C., Printed in the United States of America.
 2012, Yu, Kongjian, The Big Feet Aesthetics and The art of Survival. Architectural Design, Nov/Dec. No.220:72-77. 
 2011, Yu, Kongjian, Sisi Wang & Dihua Li: The negative approach to urban growth planning of Beijing, China, Journal of Environmental Planning and Management, 54:9,1209-1236 
 2011, Yu, Kongjian,  Ecological infrastructure leads the way: the negative approach and landscape urbanism for smart preservation and smart growth, in Matthias Richter and Ulrike Weiland (Editors), Applied Urban Ecology: A Global Framework, pp. 152–166. 
 2011, Yu, Kongjian, Landscape as a living system: Shanghai 2010 Expo Houtan Park, in Matthias Richter and Ulrike Weiland (Editors), Applied Urban Ecology: A Global Framework (editor ), pp. 186–192. 
2010, Yu, Kongjian, Five Traditions for Landscape Urbanism Thinking, Topos, (71):58-63
 2010, Yu, Kongjian, the Big-Foot Revolution, in: Mohsen Mostafavi with Gareth Doherty, Harvard University Graduate School of Design) (eds.) Ecological Urbanism, Lars Müller Publishers, Page282-291
 2010, Yu, Kongjian, The Good Earth Recovered, Return of Landscape" Edited by Donata Valentien, Jovis publishers, Berlin (page:225-233)
 2009, Yu, Kongjian,  Beautiful Big Feet: Toward a New Landscape Aesthetic. Harvard Design Magazine (Fall/Winter), 48-59
 2009, Yu, Kongjian,  Wang SI-Si, Li Di-Hua, The Function of Ecological Security Patterns as Urban Growth Framework in Beijing, Acta Ecologicica Sinica, Vol.29 (3):1189-1204.
 2008, Yu, Kongjian,  Li Hailong Li Dihua, the Negative Approach and Ecological Infrastructure: The Smart Preservation of Natural Systems in The Process of Urbanization.  Journal of Natural Resources.  Vol.23 (6): 937–958. 
 2008, Yu, Kongjian,  Zhang Lei and Dihua Li, Live With Water: Flood Adaptive Landscapes in the Yellow River Basin of China, Journal of Landscape Architecture, 2:6-17
 2007, Yu, Kongjian and Mary G. Padua, China's cosmetic cities: Urban fever and superficiality, Landscape Research, Volume 32, Issue 2: 255 - 272
 2006, Yu, Kongjian,  Dihua Li and Nuyu Li,  The evolution of Greenways in China, Landscape and Urban Planning, 76: 223-239
 1996, Yu, Kongjian,  Security patterns and surface model and in landscape planning. Landscape and Urban Planning. 36(5)1~17.
 1995, Yu, Kongjian, Security Patterns in Landscape Planning with a Case Study in South China. Doctoral Thesis, Graduate School of Design, Harvard University, MA. USA.
 1995, Yu, Kongjian, Cultural variations in landscape preference: comparisons among Chinese sub-groups and Western design experts, landscape and Urban Planning, 32(2):107-126.
2010, Yu, Kongjian,  Qiaoyuan Park: An Ecosystem Services-Oriented Regenerative Design, Topos, 5:26-33.2010, Yu, Kongjian,  Landscape as Ecological Infrastructure for an Alternative Urbanity, In: Mohsen Mostafavi (ed.), Implicate & Explicate, Aga Khan Award for Architecture, Lars Müller Publishers, pp. 282–283

Publications about Kongjian Yu and Turenscape

Books 

2019, Caterina Padoa Schioppa, Kongjian Yu. Turenscape 1998–2018, 
2012, William Saunders (Editor), Designed Ecologies: The Landscape Architecture of Kongjian Yu (assemble articles by internationally acclaimed authors from landscape design and urbanism: John Beardsley, Peter Rowe, Kelly Shannon, Peter Walker, et al.), BirkhÃuser Architecture.  
2018, Terreform (ed.) Letters to the Leaders of China: Kongjian Yu and the Future of the Chinese City, with contributions by Michael Sorkin, Peter Rowe, Thomas. J. Campanella, A. Weiwei, Z. Lin, X. Ren, P.G. Rowe, M. Sorkin, D. Sui, J. Sze, Terreform, New York.

Articles 
 2020, Kongjian Yu and the redefinition of china's cultural landscape, Interview with: Margarita Jover Biboum, Rubén Garcia Rubio, Carlos Ávila Calzada. In:ZARCH, Journal of interdisciplinary studies in Architecture and Urbanism ,No. 15 | 2020,
2019, Allan W. Shearer, "The Paradox of Security," Places Journal, October 2019. Accessed 18 Dec 2019. https://doi.org/10.22269/191029 2018, Erica Gies, Sponge Cities: Restoring natural water flows in cities can lessen the impacts of floods and droughts, Scientific American, 2018(12):80-85
2018, Betsy Anderson, Found In Translation, Turenscape frames the future in a historic American community, Landscape Architecture Magazine, 2018(11): 106-121
2018, Micheal Sorkin, Can China's cities survive? In: Letters to the leaders of China: Kongjian Yu and the future of the Chinese city, edited by Terreform, UR publication, pp6–15 
2018, Daniel Sui, China's urban design dilemma: Nature or Culture? In: Letters to the leaders of China: Kongjian Yu and the future of the Chinese city, edited by Terreform, UR publication, pp164–173 
2018, Peter G. Rowe, Spatial practices in China's urban residential districts: A time for change, In: Letters to the leaders of China: Kongjian Yu and the future of the Chinese city, edited by Terreform, UR publication, pp206–221
2018, Thomas J. Campanella, the Bucks Stopped Here, In: Letters to the leaders of China: Kongjian Yu and the future of the Chinese city, edited by Terreform, UR publication, pp148–163
2018, Zhongjie Lin, When Green Was the New Black: What went wrong with china's eco-city movement? In: Letters to the leaders of China: Kongjian Yu and the future of the Chinese city, edited by Terreform, UR publication, pp184–195 
2018, Julie Sze, Earth Citizens and Sky Cities: sustainability and scale in urban china, In: Letters to the leaders of China: Kongjian Yu and the future of the Chinese city, edited by Terreform, UR publication, pp174–183
2018, Xuefei Ren, In Search of the Cosmopolitan Chinese city: Guangzhou's urban villages, In: Letters to the leaders of China: Kongjian Yu and the future of the Chinese city, edited by Terreform, UR publication, pp164–173
2018, Felicia Toh, Creating Sponge Cities, CUBES, 2018(08): 80-87
2016, Charles Waldhelm, Landscape as Urbanism, "Yu represents a historical singularity and is arguably the most important landscape architect practicing in China today", pp171–175.
2015, Susan Cohen, The inspired landscape: Twenty-one Leading Landscape Architects Explore the Creative Process. Rice Campus and Red Ribbon Park. pp238–253.
2015, Meaghan Kombol, 30X30 Landscape Architecture, Kongjian Yu, Turenscape, pp. 302–307.
2014, Xin Wu, On Kongjian Yu's Art of the Landscape, Jamini, 1(2):71-70. 
2014, Mary G. Padua, China: new cultures and changing urban cultures, In: Maggie Roe and Ken Taylor (eds.), New Cultural Landscapes, Routledge, London and New York, 202–222.
2014, Robert Schafer, the Landscape Architecture of Kongjian Yu, Topos,09.05, 2014.
2014, Carla Wheeler, Client Earth— Geodesigning Our World with Nature and Technology, (Reviews on Kongjian Yu's Keynote Speech on Geodesign Summit), Esri 2014-02-24.
2014, Tania Ramos Gianone, 10 Awesome Riverbank Projects: A look at some of the world's most outstanding riverbank projects. (2 of the 10 was designed by Kongjian Yu/Turenscape) http://landarchs.com/10-awesome-riverbank-projects/ 
2014, Ian Thompson, Ten landscape designers who changed the world, Landscape Architecture: A Very Short introduction (Oxford University Press), May 30th2014 http://blog.oup.com/2014/05/landscape-designers-vsi/.
2014, Paul McAtomney, Top 10 Names in Planting Design, Feb 5, 2014,http://landarchs.com/top-10-names-in-planting-design/
2013, ASLA Landscape Architecture Magazine, Big In China: The Marvels of Turenscape, in: Landscape Architecture Magazine (ASLA), seven articles by four noted scholars, in total 58 pages, reviewing Kongjian Yu and Turenscape projects and research.
2013, William Saunders, The Phenomenal Dr. Yu, in: Landscape Architecture, Feb.2013/vol.103, No.2, The Magazine of The American Society of Landscape Architects. pp. 56–59
2013, James Grayson Truelove, Ribbon Runs through It, A Chinese opera in a Xuzhou park, in: Landscape Architecture, Feb.2013/vol.103, No.2, The Magazine of The American Society of Landscape Architects. pp. 60–69.
2013, Sarah Williams Goldhagen, All Work: Shanghai's Houtan Park Could be More Eager to Please, in: Landscape Architecture, Feb.2013/vol.103, No.2, The Magazine of The American Society of Landscape Architects. pp. 70–79.
2013, Mary G. Padua, Bridge to Somewhere Else: How to Forget Tianjin Fast, in: Landscape Architecture, Feb.2013/vol.103, No.2, The Magazine of The American Society of Landscape Architects. pp. 80–87.
2013, James Grayson Trulove, Look! Don't Touch, At Qunli Stormwater Park, The Draw of Impenetrable, in: Landscape Architecture, Feb.2013/vol.103, No.2, and The Magazine of The American Society of Landscape Architects. pp. 88–97.
2013 Mary G. Padua, Triptych by the Sea, Life Returns to Shore of Qinhuangdao, in: Landscape Architecture, Feb.2013/vol.103, No.2, The Magazine of The American Society of Landscape Architects. pp. 98–107.
2013, James Grayson Trulove, Home Grown, Kongjian Yu's Apartment Puts 50 Tons of Rainwater to Use. In: Landscape Architecture, Feb.2013/vol.103, No.2, The Magazine of The American Society of Landscape Architects. pp. 108–113. 
2013, Tore Edvard Bergaust and Karsten Jørgensen, Landscape Planning in China: Floods and Water Management. Architecture Norway, 06 Jun, 2013
2013, Li Shuya, Yu Kongjian: Back to Earth, China Pictorial, 781, July 2013: 16–21.
2013, Jared Green, Kongjian Yu, China's Olmsted, ASLA Dirt, 2013-01-30. 
2013, Alvin Powell, Harvard Gazette: With Nature in Mind, (featuring Kongjian Yu and his Shnaghai Houtan Park), April 23, 2013.
2013, Barry W. Starke, John Ormsbee Simonds, 2013, Landscape Architecture: A Manual of Environmental planning and Design, (11 projects by Kongjian Yu/Turenscape were selected for the text book), McGraw-Hill Education, LLC. 
2012, Francesc Zamora Mola, The Sourcebook of Contemporary Urban Design, (3 projects by Kongjian Yu/Turenscpe, including Sampling Gardens—The Tianjin Qiaoyuna Park, The Red Ribbon Park The Floating Gardens were included in the book):. LOFT Publications.pp. 406–437.
2012, Xin Wu, Konjian YU—Between Cheesiness and Vernacular Modernity. In: The New Art of Landscape—Conversations between Xin Wu and Contemporary Designers, China Building Industry Press, Beijing. pp. 001–031
2012, Peter Walker, Kongjian Yu's Challenge, in: William Saunders (Editor), Designed Ecologies: The Landscape Architecture of Kongjian Yu, BirkhÃuser, Basel, p. 7. 
2012, John Beardsley, Public History, Popular Aesthetics, in: William Saunders (Editor), Designed Ecologies: The Landscape Architecture of Kongjian Yu, BirkhÃuser, Basel, p. 10-19.
2012, Antje Stokman, Fiascoes of Chinese Urban Development and Turenscape's Alternatives, in: William Saunders (Editor), Designed Ecologies: The Landscape Architecture of Kongjian Yu, BirkhÃuser, Basel, p. 34-41.
2012, Frederick R. Steiner, The Activist Educator, in: William Saunders (Editor), Designed Ecologies: The Landscape Architecture of Kongjian Yu, BirkhÃuser, Basel, p. 106-115.
2012, William S. Saunders, The Boy Who Read Books Riding a Water Buffalo, in: William Saunders (Editor), Designed Ecologies: The Landscape Architecture of Kongjian Yu, BirkhÃuser, Basel, p. 60-65.
2012, Kristina Hill, Myths and Strategies of Ecological Planning, in: William Saunders (Editor), Designed Ecologies: The Landscape Architecture of Kongjian Yu, BirkhÃuser, Basel, p. 144-151.
2012, Peter G. Rowe, China's Water Resources and Houtan Park, in: William Saunders (Editor), Designed Ecologies: The Landscape Architecture of Kongjian Yu, BirkhÃuser, Basel, p. 184-191.
2012, Kelly Shannon, (R) evolutionary Ecological Infrastructures, in: William Saunders (Editor), Designed Ecologies: The Landscape Architecture of Kongjian Yu, BirkhÃuser, Basel, p. 200-211.
2012, Charles Waldheim, the Persistent Promise of Ecological Planning, in: William Saunders (Editor), Designed Ecologies: The Landscape Architecture of Kongjian Yu, BirkhÃuser, Basel, p. 250-253.
2012, Y-Jean Mun-Delsalle and Dr Nirmal Kishnani, Asia's Sustainable Future in China and India - Interview Yu Kongjian, Ashok Lall, FuturArc, 2012 (26), Green Issue,  26 (3Q):44-55
2012, Ethel Baraona, Qunli National Urban Wetland, Nature as Infrastructure——An interview with Kongjian Yu, DOMUS, 2012 (948):60-65.
2010, Bill Marken, Groundbreaker: Kongjian Yu, Garden Designer, 75–80.
2008 Antje Stokman, Stefanie Ruff, 2008, The Red Ribbon Tanghe River Park Reconciling Water Management, Landscape Design and Ecology, Topos: 63:29
2008, Mary G. Padua, a Fine Red Line——the Tanghe River Park, Landscape Architecture, 98(2008): 92-99
2008, Andrew Wilson, In Praise of Conceptual Gardens, Featuring Red Ribbon, BBC Gardens, 90–93.
2008, Jared Green, Interview With Kongjian Yu, Designer Of The Red Ribbon, Tang He River Park, 11/03, 2008, Dirt, ASLA.
2007, Graham Johnstone and Xiangfeng Kong, Making friends with floods: an ecological park reclaims a degraded stretch of a Chinese River, Landscape Architecture, 2007, April, pp106–115
2007, The Architectural Review, Field Studies——Shenyang Architectural University in China enjoys a productive landscape. The Architectural Review, December, pp. 58–59.
2007, Mark Frisby, The art of survival, Landscape Architecture, Australia, 2007, August, page: 14
2007, Marilyn Clemens, A review on the art of survival, Landscape Architecture, 2007, April, p. 135
2007, Landscape Today, Converse with Dr. Kongjian Yu about landscape architecture in china, Landscape Today, 2007.pp. 60–62. 
2006, The Dirt, "if we can save china, we can save the world", ASLA.org, October 7,http://www.asla.org/land/dirt/
2006, Padua, Mary G., Touching The Good Earth——An innovative campus design reconnects students to China's agricultural landscapes, Landscape Architecture, Vol 96 (12) :100-107 
2006, Landscape Australia, Kongjian Yu address contemporary landscape architecture, Landscape Australia, No.109, Feb.2006: 46-48 
2006, Jakes, Susan. A force of nature. TIME: Asia, 2006, April 10
2006, Andy Miller,_Claire Martin,_Steph Kerr, Kongjian Yu discuss ecology, cultural identity and his promotion of the profession of landscape architecture. Landscape urbanism, 15:30-32, 
2005, Antje Stokman and Stefanie Ruff, Prospective Internationality and identity——search for a contemporary design idiom in China. Topos, 51: Prospective Landscapes, pp. 66–75
2003, Mary G. Padua, Industrial strength——Zhongshan Shipyard Park, Landscape Architecture, 93 (6):76-85,105-107.

See also 

 Landscape Urbanism
 Ecological Urbanism
 Landscape Architecture

References

Harvard University faculty
Living people
Harvard Graduate School of Design alumni
Chinese landscape architects
Chinese urban planners
Chinese gardeners
Academic staff of Peking University
Year of birth missing (living people)